Der Ochse von Kulm is an East German film. It was released in 1955, and sold more than 4,100,000 tickets.

Cast
 Thea Aichbichler - Therese
 Ferdinand Anton - Alois
 Franz Arzdorf - Chef des Landwirtschaftsamtes
 Bruno Atlas-Eising - Bauer
 Wolfgang Bachmann - Beamter
 Waltraud Backmann - Amerikanerin
 Ingrid Barkmann - Wirtin der Bayrischen Bierstube
 Richard Bendey - Postbote
 Rolf Bergmann - Amerikaner
 Trude Brentina - Bäuerin
 Werner Buttler - Polizist
 Charlotte Böttge - Bäuerin
 Lotte Crusius - Bäuerin
 Hannes Cujath - Militärpolizist
 Jac Diehl - Gemeindediener

References

External links
 

1955 films
East German films
1950s German-language films
German black-and-white films
1950s German films